Stephen Albion Day (July 13, 1882 – January 5, 1950) was a U.S. Representative from Illinois.

Biography
Day was born in Canton, Ohio, the son of Mary Elizabeth (Schaefer) and William R. Day, who was a diplomat and jurist. Day attended the public schools at Canton, the University School at Cleveland, Ohio, and Asheville (North Carolina) School. He graduated from the University of Michigan at Ann Arbor in 1905, and subsequently served as secretary to Chief Justice Melville W. Fuller of the Supreme Court of the United States from 1905 to 1907.

He studied law at the University of Michigan Law School. He was admitted to the bar in 1907 and commenced practice in Cleveland, Ohio. He moved to Evanston, Illinois, in 1908 and continued the practice of law in Chicago, Illinois. He served as special counsel to the Comptroller of the Currency from 1926 to 1928.

Day was elected as a Republican to the Seventy-seventh and Seventy-eighth Congresses (January 3, 1941 – January 3, 1945). He was an unsuccessful candidate for reelection in 1944 to the Seventy-ninth Congress. He resumed the practice of law in Evanston, Illinois, where he died on January 5, 1950. He was interred in Memorial Park, Skokie, Illinois.

See also 
 List of law clerks of the Supreme Court of the United States (Chief Justice)
 List of law clerks of the Supreme Court of the United States (Seat 10)

References

1882 births
1950 deaths
Candidates in the 1936 United States presidential election
Law clerks of the Supreme Court of the United States
University of Michigan Law School alumni
Republican Party members of the United States House of Representatives from Illinois
20th-century American politicians